The Danish Darts Challenge is a darts tournament organised by the Danish Darts Organization. The event will begin on Sunday 7 February 2016 in Odense and end with the Play-Offs on Sunday 13 Marts 2016. 
The final saw the favorite Per Skau lose to a very well playing Dennis Lindskjold.

Players

Dennis "The Beast" Lindskjold
The Beast is a previous winner of the Danish national championships (2014) and the 2014 winner of the Nordic Invitational - he did represent Scandinavia at the 2014 PDC World Championships.

Per "PER-FECT" Skau
PER-FECT is a well known name for darts enthusiasts, he is a former number 1 in the world and winner of Finland, Swiss and German Open - he is the reigning Danish champion.

Niels-Jørgen "The Eagle" Hansen
The Eagle is relative unknown outside Denmark, but has some good results in pairs, winning the pairs at both Austria and Swedish Open .

Mogens "Turbo" Christensen
Did win the Danish nationals in 2012 and has since established himself on the Danish national team.

Stig "The Stig" Jørgensen
Has been selected 26 times for Denmark, a record that probably will stand for some time.

Frede "The Panther" Johansen
The Panther did reach the semifinal at the 2000 Europe Cup and is a 4 times Danish champion.

Results

7 February (Round 1)

21 February (Round 2)

28 February (Round 3)

Table

Play-Offs (13 Marts)

References

Darts in Denmark